Ludwig Eduard Theodor Lösener (23 November 1865 – 2 June 1941) was a German botanist who collected widely in the field in Germany: Amrum island (1912), the Alps, the Black Forest, Bavaria, Rügen island and Tyrol in modern Austria. His speciality was the Aquifoliaceae of the world. He also studied cultivars of Ilex species. His name is often spelled as 'Loesener' in English sources.

In 1941, botanist Albert Charles Smith published a genus of flowering plants belonging to the family Celastraceae, as Loeseneriella in his honour.

Works

Abbreviation
The abbreviation Loes. is used to indicate Ludwig Eduard Theodor Lösener as an authority in the description and scientific classification of plants. The International Plant Names Index lists more than 1800 taxa attributed Lösener.

References

External links 
Ludwig Eduard Theodor Loesener on Wikispecies

Botanists with author abbreviations
1865 births
1941 deaths
20th-century German botanists
19th-century German botanists